Julio Martínez (born 15 May 1949) is a Puerto Rican weightlifter. He competed at the 1972 Summer Olympics and the 1976 Summer Olympics.

References

1949 births
Living people
Puerto Rican male weightlifters
Olympic weightlifters of Puerto Rico
Weightlifters at the 1972 Summer Olympics
Weightlifters at the 1976 Summer Olympics
Place of birth missing (living people)
20th-century Puerto Rican people